Isabel Marques Swan (born November 18, 1983) is a Brazilian sailor. She won a bronze medal in 470 class at the 2008 Summer Olympics.

Born in Rio de Janeiro and raised in Niterói, she started sailing at the age of 8, influenced by her father, with whom she would compete in the 1998 Tornado World Championship, and her aunt and godmother Cláudia Swan, who was the first Brazilian female sailor in the Olympics, in 1992. In 2004, Fernanda Oliveira, who had just competed in the 2004 Summer Olympics, invited Swan to sail with her in the 470 class, a partnership that led to Brazil's first female medal in sailing. Afterwards Swan tried to compete in the Laser Radial before returning to the 470 partnering Martine Grael. After losing the 2012 Summer Olympics spot to Oliveira and Ana Barbachan, Swan and Grael parted ways, with the latter moving onto the 49er FX class and Swan calling Renata Decnop to be her new partner. After losing to Oliveira and Barbachan again in the qualifiers for the 2016 Summer Olympics, Swan changed classes to the Nacra 17 in 2014, and alongside Samuel Albrecht, eventually earned her spot in the Olympic competition, where she finished tenth.

A social communication graduate from Fluminense Federal University, Swan was also one of the embassadors who spoke for the Rio de Janeiro bid for the 2016 Summer Olympics in the 121st IOC Session.

References

External links
 
 
 
 

1983 births
Living people
Sportspeople from Niterói
Brazilian female sailors (sport)
Sailors at the 2008 Summer Olympics – 470
Sailors at the 2016 Summer Olympics – Nacra 17
Medalists at the 2008 Summer Olympics
Olympic sailors of Brazil
Olympic bronze medalists for Brazil
Olympic medalists in sailing
Universiade medalists in sailing
Universiade bronze medalists for Brazil
Medalists at the 2011 Summer Universiade
21st-century Brazilian women